Burl is the given name of:

Burl Barer (born 1947), American author and literary historian best known for his work on the character of Simon Templar, aka "the Saint"
Burl Cain, warden of Louisiana State Penitentiary (also known as Angola)
Burl Jaybird Coleman (1896-1950), American country blues harmonica player, guitarist and singer
Burl Ives (1909-1995), American actor, folk music singer and writer
Burl Osborne (c. 1937–2012), American reporter and publisher
Burl Plunkett (1933–2008), former women's basketball coach at the University of Oklahoma
Burl S. Watson (1893-1975), American businessman

See also
Berl (name)